Ross is a suburb of the town of Alice Springs, in the Northern Territory, Australia.

The suburb is named after John Ross, who explored the area in 1870.

Ross is located within the federal division of Lingiari, the territory electoral division of Braitling and the local government area of the Town of Alice Springs.

References

Suburbs of Alice Springs